Erwan Quintin (born 1 February 1984) is a French professional footballer who plays as a midfielder for Championnat National 2 club Vannes.

Career
Quintin was born in Auray. He started his career in the youth ranks of Vannes at the age of 19, progressing to the first team in 2002. He left in 2003 and joined the reserves of Bordeaux. He was taken into the first team training group when senior players departed for the 2004 African Cup of Nations, and made his one Ligue 1 appearance for the club as a substitute against Nantes on 6 February 2004.

In his second spell at Vannes, Quintin played in 37 of 38 league games as the club won the 2007–08 Championnat National. He was also in the team that were runners-up in the 2009 Coupe de la Ligue Final, beating Ligue 1 opposition three times on the way to the final.

In January 2015, Whilst playing for Châteauroux, Quintin suffered serious head injuries in an aerial challenge during the match again Clermont. He required surgery for broken jaw, nose and palate, and suffered twelve broken teeth.

Quintin rejoined Vannes for a third spell in 2017, leaving Laval after two seasons for what he described in an interview as "personal reasons", giving up his professional status.

In a professional career spanning 14 seasons, Quintin made 215 appearances in Ligue 2 for Vannes, Arles-Avignon, Châteauroux and Laval and 114 in the Championnat National for Entente SSG, Nîmes and Vannes.

Honours
Vannes
 Championnat National: 2007–08
 Coupe de la Ligue: runner-up 2008–09

References

External links
 
 
 
 

Living people
1984 births
People from Auray
Sportspeople from Morbihan
Association football midfielders
French footballers
Association football defenders
Vannes OC players
FC Girondins de Bordeaux players
Nîmes Olympique players
Entente SSG players
AC Arlésien players
LB Châteauroux players
Stade Lavallois players
Ligue 1 players
Ligue 2 players
Championnat National players
Championnat National 2 players
Footballers from Brittany
Brittany international footballers